Ludwig van Beethoven's Piano Sonata No. 23 in F minor, Op. 57 (colloquially known as the Appassionata, meaning "passionate" in Italian) is among the three famous piano sonatas of his middle period (the others being the Waldstein, Op. 53 and Les Adieux, Op. 81a); it was composed during 1804 and 1805, and perhaps 1806, and was dedicated to Count Franz von Brunswick. The first edition was published in February 1807 in Vienna.

Unlike the early Sonata No. 8, Pathétique, the Appassionata was not named during the composer's lifetime, but was so labelled in 1838 by the publisher of a four-hand arrangement of the work. Instead, Beethoven's autograph manuscript of the sonata has "La Passionata" written on the cover, in Beethoven's hand.

One of his greatest and most technically challenging piano sonatas, the Appassionata was considered by Beethoven to be his most tempestuous piano sonata until the twenty-ninth piano sonata (known as the Hammerklavier). 1803 was the year Beethoven came to grips with the irreversibility of his progressively deteriorating hearing.

An average performance of the entire Appassionata sonata lasts about twenty-five minutes.

Form

The sonata, in F minor, consists of three movements:

Allegro assai

A sonata-allegro form in  time, the first movement progresses quickly through startling changes in tone and dynamics, and is characterised by an economic use of themes.

The main theme, in octaves, is quiet and ominous. It consists of a down-and-up arpeggio in dotted rhythm that cadences on the tonicized dominant, immediately repeated a semitone higher (in G). This use of the Neapolitan chord (i.e. the flattened supertonic) is an important structural element in the work, also being the basis of the main theme of the finale.

As in Beethoven's Waldstein sonata, the coda is unusually long, containing quasi-improvisational arpeggios which span most of the early 19th-century piano's range. The choice of F minor becomes very clear when one realises that this movement makes frequent use of the deep, dark tone of the lowest F1 on the piano, which was the lowest note available to Beethoven at the time.

Andante con moto

A set of variations in D major, on a theme remarkable for its melodic simplicity combined with the use of unusually thick voicing and a peculiar counter-melody in the bass. Its sixteen bars (repeated) consist of nothing but common chords, set in a series of four- and two-bar phrases that all end on the tonic. (See image.) The four variations follow:

The fourth variation ends with a deceptive cadence containing the dominant chord that resolves to a soft diminished seventh, followed by a much louder diminished seventh that serves as a transition (without pause) to the finale.

The total performance time of this movement is about 6 to 8 minutes.

Allegro ma non troppo – Presto

A sonata-allegro in near-perpetual motion in which, very unusually, the second part is directed to be repeated, and not the first. It has much in common with the first movement, including extensive use of the Neapolitan sixth chord and several written-out cadenzas. The movement climaxes with a faster coda (at presto speed as seen above and in many editions) introducing a new theme which in turn leads into an extended final cadence in F minor. According to Donald Francis Tovey this is one of only a handful of Beethoven's works in sonata form that ends in tragedy (the others being the C minor Piano Trio, Piano Sonata Op. 27 no. 2 ("Moonlight"), and the Violin Sonata Op. 30 no. 2.).

References

External links
 
 Public domain score and midi file of the 2nd movement on Mutopia
 Further analysis at BBC Radio 3
 

Piano Sonata 23
1806 compositions
Compositions in F minor
Music with dedications